"Smile In Your Sleep", sometimes known as "Hush, Hush, Time To Be Sleeping" (Scots: "Hush, Hush, Time Tae Be Sleepin") is a Scottish folk song and lament written by Jim McLean and set to the tune of the Gaelic air, "Chi Mi Na Mòrbheanna" (literally "I will see the great mountains", or "The Mist Covered Mountain"). It follows the experiences of crofters during the Highland Clearances through eviction and emigration.

Notes

External links

Laments
Scottish folk songs
Year of song unknown